The Zhyvotiv Regiment was one the territorial-administrative subdivisions of the Cossack Hetmanate. The regiment's capital was the city of Zhyvotiv, now a village in Vinnytsia Oblast of western and southwestern Ukraine.

Regiment was raised in 1648, during Khmelnytsky Uprising. Shortly after Treaty of Zboriv, in 1649, the regiment was disbanded. The regiments sotnias were all transferred to Kalnyk Regiment. In 1651 its former sotnias were transferred again to Pavoloch Regiment.

Structure
The regiment comprised 4 sotnias:
 Borshchahivka
 Pohrebyshche
 Tetiiv
 Zhyvotiv

References

Sources 

Cossack Hetmanate Regiments
History of Vinnytsia Oblast